Shauna Michelle Cooper is an American psychologist at the University of North Carolina at Chapel Hill. Her research considers how race, culture and context influence the development of African-American young people.

Early life and education 
Cooper studied psychology at the University of North Carolina at Chapel Hill. Her honors essay considered what influences academic disidentification (i.e. the rejection of academic identity). She moved to the University of Michigan for her graduate studies, where she focussed on developmental psychology. In 2005 Cooper was appointed an Eunice Kennedy Shriver National Institute of Child Health and Human Development Fellow at the University of North Carolina at Chapel Hill.

Research and career 
In 2007 Cooper joined the University of South Carolina as an assistant professor in psychology. She was awarded an National Science Foundation CAREER Award to investigate how the engagement of African-American fathers impacted the social adjustment and academic attainment of early adolescents.

She moved to the University of North Carolina at Chapel Hill as an associate professor in 2017. Her research considers family socialisation, race-related experiences and developmental transitions. At UNC-Chapel Hill, Cooper leads the STAR (Strengths, Assets & Resilience) Laboratory. The STAR lab consider the roles of African-American mothers and fathers in the lives of young people. Alongside studying the dynamics of African-American families, Cooper has investigated the relationship between race-relations and family finance.

During the COVID-19 pandemic, Cooper expressed concern about how the stress of the pandemic was impacting young people's mental health.

Awards and honours 
She was named the 2018 University of North Carolina at Chapel Hill Thorp Faculty Engaged Scholar. Cooper serves on the Society for Research in Child Development Equity & Justice Committee and the Society for Research in Adolescence consensus committee. Alongside her academic research, Cooper is involved with the training and mentoring of early career psychologists, particularly those from communities of colour.

Select publications 

=

References 

21st-century American women
21st-century American psychologists
American women academics
American women psychologists
Living people
University of Michigan alumni
University of North Carolina at Chapel Hill faculty
Year of birth missing (living people)